The Quasar Flavio is a Czech high-wing, single-place, hang glider that was designed by world hang gliding champion Tomáš Suchánek and is produced by Quasar of Dolní Bečva. The aircraft is supplied complete and ready-to-fly.

Design and development
The Flavio was designed as an intermediate sport and leisure wing available in just one size. It is made from aluminum tubing, with the double-surface wing covered in Dacron sailcloth. Its  span wing is cable braced from a single kingpost.

The Flavio is certified by the Light Aircraft Association of the Czech Republic.

Specifications (Flavio)

References

External links

Flavio
Hang gliders